Morris March Estee (November 23, 1833 – October 27, 1903) was an American Republican lawyer and politician from California.

Estee was born in Pennsylvania but spent his young adult life in Sacramento from 1857 to 1859. His business card read: M.M.Estee, Attorney and Counselor at Law, Office: No 88 J Street, bet, Third and Fourth, (South Side,) Sacramento. He was elected in 1862 to the California State Assembly, one of five members representing the 16th District. From 1863 to 1866 he was District Attorney for Sacramento County.

In 1866 he moved to San Francisco, and practiced with a number of partners including John Henry Boalt.
In 1873 he was reelected to the Assembly, one of 12 members representing the San Francisco portion of the 8th District, and he was Speaker of the Assembly from 1873 to 1874.

Estee was nominated and ran twice as a Republican for Governor of California. In his first run, Estee was defeated by Democrat George Stoneman in 1882. His second and final run in 1895 placed him against James Budd, who also defeated him. Estee also had two failed elections to the U.S. Senate. On June 2, 1900 he was appointed the first US Federal District Court judge for the Territory of Hawaii.

Estee died October 27, 1903 in Honolulu, Hawaii, at age 69.

References

External links
Key dates in life

1833 births
1903 deaths
Speakers of the California State Assembly
Republican Party members of the California State Assembly
Lawyers from Sacramento, California
Politicians from San Francisco
Politicians from Sacramento, California
Lawyers from San Francisco
Hawaii Republicans
19th-century American politicians
Judges of the United States District Court for the Territory of Hawaii
United States federal judges appointed by William McKinley